Androsace delphinensis is a plant species in the family Primulaceae.

Taxonomy
Androsace delphinensis was named after the region of Dauphiné, a former French province in the southern French Alps. The holotype was collected in Pic Coolidge in Ecrins in Hautes-Alpes of France.

Description
It is made of loose to slightly compact rosettes. Its hairs are often branched with a short branch at the top, sometimes broken. The flowers are always white,  in diameter. It typically flowers from June to August.

Habitat and distribution
This species is endemic to the southwestern Alps (Écrins, Grandes Rousses, Belledonne).

References

delphinensis
Alpine flora
Flora of the Alps